Bengalized is a term with origins among Cincinnati Bengals football fans and/or players.  It usually refers to a Cincinnati Bengals player who, after multiple seasons of poor team performance, develops hostility with the coaching staff or ownership operation, and cultivates pessimism about remaining with the team.  This results in efforts by the player to prompt a trade or release from the team.  Bengalized can also refer to a Cincinnati Bengals fan who becomes frustrated after years of futility in losing seasons and/or playoff losses, ultimately ending their support for the franchise.  

Bengalized may also refer to a newly acquired Bengals player or draftee who, upon recognition of high talent and ability, becomes injured (or performs poorly) while playing for the Bengals, which essentially ruins a favorable NFL career.

The specific origin of the term is unknown, but may have roots in promising former Bengals quarterback Greg Cook who was a first round selection by the Bengals in the 1969 NFL draft.  After posting outstanding numbers in the first three games of the 1969 season, a shoulder injury in his third game from a hit to his throwing arm effectively ended his NFL career.

Multiple other Cincinnati Bengals players who may also be known for becoming Bengalized are David Klingler, Akili Smith, Ki-Jana Carter, Carl Pickens, Dan Wilkinson, Chris Perry, Levi Jones, Corey Dillon, Chad Johnson, Carson Palmer, and Carlos Dunlap.

References

Cincinnati Bengals
Culture of Cincinnati
Slang